Platon Eustathios Drakoulis or Drakoules (1858 – 27 May 1942) was a Greek socialist politician. Drakoulis, once a lecturer at Oxford University, was one of the pioneers of the socialist labour movement in Greece. An energetic agitator and the most prominent figure in the nascent socialist movement, Drakoulis founded the Workers League of Greece. In August 1910, he was one of ten socialists elected to the national parliament and cooperated with the political party of Eleftherios Venizelos. He supported Greece's war efforts during the first world war. He was a founder of the Greek Anti-Carnivore society and married English humanitarian and animal rights campaigner Alice Marie Lambe, in 1907.

Selected publications
 Study of the French Revolution (1890)
 Specimen for the Worker: The Foundations of Socialism (1893)
 Light Insider (1894)
 Greek Language and Literature (1897)
 Emancipation of Women (1912)

References

External links
 D. [Drakoules], "Greece and Social-Democracy", Justice, 6 March 1897, p. 4.
 Platon E. Drakoules, “The End of Venizelism”, Justice, 2 December 1920, p. 2.

1858 births
Academics of the University of Oxford
Greek MPs 1910 (August–November)
Greek socialists

National and Kapodistrian University of Athens alumni
People from Ithaca
Year of death uncertain